Hugo Svensson (6 January 1891 – 23 April 1960) was a Swedish athlete. He competed in the men's pole vault at the 1912 Summer Olympics.

References

1891 births
1960 deaths
Athletes (track and field) at the 1912 Summer Olympics
Swedish male pole vaulters
Olympic athletes of Sweden
Place of birth missing